Miss Grand Chile 2021 was the third edition of the Miss Grand Chile beauty pageant, held on September 25, 2021 at the Criss Chacana Model Agency, Iquique. Eight contestants competed for the right to represent the country at the Miss Grand International 2021 in Thailand, of whom Vanessa Echeverría of San Pedro de Atacama was elected the winner, but she got a non-plcement after participating at the aforementioned international contest.

Results

Contestants
8 contestants competed for the title.

References

External links

 

Miss Grand Chile
Chilean awards
Grand Chile